Bhalaiana, sometimes spelled Bhallaiana is a village in the Giddarbaha tehsil of Sri Muktsar Sahib district in Eastern Punjab, India.

Geography

Demographic

At the 2001 census, the village had a total population of 6,550 in 1,093 households, of whom 3,459 were males and 3,091 females.
Thus males constituted 53% and females 47% of the population with the sex ratio of 894 females per thousand males.

Economy & others

Agriculture is the main occupation of the villagers, some of them have their own general and medical stores.
The village has a branch of the State Bank of Patiala.

References

Villages in Sri Muktsar Sahib district